ʻAbd al-Bāsiṭ (ALA-LC romanization of ) is a male Muslim given name. It is built from the Arabic words ʻabd and al-Bāsiṭ, one of the names of God in the Qur'an, which give rise to the Muslim theophoric names. It means "servant of the Expander".

It may refer to:

Abdul Basit 'Abd us-Samad (1927–1988), Egyptian Qari (reciter of the Qur-an)
Abdelbaset al-Megrahi (1952–2012), Libyan convicted of the Lockerbie bombing
Abdulbaset Sieda (born 1956), Kurdish-Syrian academic and politician
Amr Abdel Basset Abdel Azeez Diab, known as Amr Diab (born 1961), Egyptian singer
Abdul Basit Mahmoud Abdul Karim, possible original name of Ramzi Yousef (born 1967), Pakistani convicted for terrorism
Abdul Basith (volleyball) (died 1991), Indian volleyball player
Abdul Basit, Ghanaian footballer
Abdul Basit, Pakistani diplomat
Abdel Basset Turki, Iraqi politician
Hafiz Abdul Basit, Pakistani held in extrajudicial detention
Abdul Basit (cricketer) (born 2003), Afghan cricketer
Abdul Baset al-Sarout (1992-2019), Syrian footballer turned rebel commander

References

Arabic masculine given names